Madaklasht (Madaklashti: ماداکلشت) is a valley located in Lower Chitral district, Khyber Pakhtunkhwa, Pakistan.  The valley is predominantly inhabited by the Tajik people who speak Madaklashti, a dialect of Persian.

Geography 
Madaklasht is located in the extreme north of Shishikoh Valley, which is part of the Lower Chitral district.  It is 40 km from  Chitral city. The average elevation is around 8,500 feet above the sea level.

History 
The people of Madaklasht came to Chitral during the late eighteenth century. It is said around 7 people from Afghanistan's and Tajikistan's Badakhshan region came to Chitral to produce firearms for the Mehtar of Chitral. The people were known by Khowar speakers as Badakhshani & 'Tajiki' and they were ironmongers.  With the time, many other groups  came from different areas of Badakhshan bordering with Tajikstan like Zebak, Minjaan & other areas and settled in Madaklasht permanently during the late eighteenth century.

Religion 
Majority of population in Madaklasht follow Ismaili sect of Islam.

Language
A dialect of Dari Farsi is the main language  and mother tongue in Madaklasht. This is very similar to the Darri Farsi being spoken in the area of Badakhshan bordering with Tajikistan. People of the valley can also speak Khowar, Urdu, Pashto & other languages.

Agriculture  
Main crops of Madaklasht are maize, potato and kidney-beans. However, wheat, barley and peas are also cultivated. Unlike to the lower areas, only one crop in a year is possible due to high altitude. Main fruits are apple, cherry, apricot & walnuts.

Climate & Weather  
Due to high altitude, Madaklasht is a cold area where the temperature is always below zero from November to March every year. In summer season it averages around 25 degree Celsius. This valley receives heavy snowfall every year around 3–4 feet on average. Avalanches & road blockages are common scene during winter season.

Tourism 
Madaklasht is one of the four villages which is included in Integrated Tourism Zone (ITZ) by the provincial government of Khyberpakhtunkhwa, Pakistan. The beautiful geographical features of the valley include the Andiveer glacier, Kurdoodh waterfall, water springs of Darbar Shahi, pine tree jungle, adventurous trekking routes to Golen in northwest, Laspur to the north and & Kumrat valley to the east are sources of attraction for tourist in the summer season. Snow sports like skiing, skating and snowboarding provide another reason for the national & international tourists to come & enjoy during winter season.  There is annual snow festival in Madaklasht which is part of the Hindukush celebrations in the region.

Facilities for the Tourists 
Hotels: There are no hotels but local guest houses which offer room & food on affordable prices. Besides, there are small shops & local market where you can buy daily use items & food.

Electricity: Madaklasht is an off-grid valley where the only source of electricity is the local micro hydro power plant constructed by AKRSP-PEDO. Power outage & low voltage is common.

Water Facility: Clean & drinkable tap water is available everywhere & throughout the year.

Internet: 4G internet is available only for Telenor users. All other networks of Pakistan are not available.

Roads: Road from Drosh to Madaklasht is around 40 km and it is non-metallic & narrow. Four-wheel drive (FWD) vehicles are recommended for travelling.

Health Facilities: There are a government dispensary and Aga Khan Health Center where basic health facilities are provided by nurses, health technicians and LHVs.

Police Station: There is no police station as the crime rate is zero in the valley for decades.

References 

Populated places in Chitral District